Marmara fraxinicola is a moth of the family Gracillariidae. It is known from Québec, Canada, and Ohio, Vermont and New York in the United States.

There is one generation per year.

The larvae feed on Fraxinus americana and Fraxinus pennsylvanica. They mine in the stem of their host plant. They mine above the ground level in the main stem and branches of the tree. They feed in the periderm, as it does when it occurs in the absence of congeners on white ash. The mine has the form of an extremely long serpentine mine in the twig, mainly on saplings or in rapidly growing shoots. The larva overwinters in the mine, resumes mining, and pupates in the spring in a broadened chamber at the end of the mine.

References

Gracillariinae
Moths described in 1922